Moelleria costulata, common name the ribbed moelleria, is a species of sea snail, a marine gastropod mollusk in the family Colloniidae.

Description
The size of the shell varies between 0.5 mm and 2.6 mm. The shell is ribbed longitudinally.

Distribution
This marine species occurs in circum-Arctic waters, off Alaska, in European waters, the Northwest Atlantic Ocean and down south to Morocco.

References

 Mighels, J. W. 1843. Descriptions of six species of shells regarded as new. Boston Journal of Natural History 4: 345–350, pl. 16. 
 Verkrüzen, T. A. 1877. Liste der von T. A. Verkrüzen in 1876 in Neufundland und Nova Scotia gesammelten Mollusken. Nachrichtsblatt der Deutschen Malakozoologischen Gesellschaft 9: 52–57.
 Turgeon, D.D., et al. 1998. Common and scientific names of aquatic invertebrates of the United States and Canada. American Fisheries Society Special Publication 26-page(s): 60 
 Brunel, P., L. Bosse, & G. Lamarche. (1998). Catalogue of the marine invertebrates of the estuary and Gulf of St. Lawrence. Canadian Special Publication of Fisheries and Aquatic Sciences, 126. 405 p.
 Gofas, S.; Le Renard, J.; Bouchet, P. (2001). Mollusca, in: Costello, M.J. et al. (Ed.) (2001). European register of marine species: a check-list of the marine species in Europe and a bibliography of guides to their identification. Collection Patrimoines Naturels, 50: pp. 180–213
 Trott, T.J. 2004. Cobscook Bay inventory: a historical checklist of marine invertebrates spanning 162 years. Northeastern Naturalist (Special Issue 2): 261 – 324

External links
 

Colloniidae
Gastropods described in 1842